Divlje jagode is the eponymous debut studio album by the Yugoslav and Bosnian heavy metal band Divlje Jagode released in 1979.

Track listing
Divlje jagode (Sead Lipovača)
Krivo je more
Bubi
Jedina moja
Želim da te imam
Mojoj ljubavi
Čekam da sunce zađe
Vodarica (Marijan Kašaj)
Sjećanja (Mustafa Ismailovski)

Personnel
Nihad Jusufhodžić - bass
Adonis Dokuzović - drums
Sead Lipovača - guitar
Mustafa Ismailovski - Organ, Piano, Synthesizer, Mellotron
Ante Janković -  lead vocals, lyrics
Sead Lipovača - music

Additional personnel
Branko Podbrežnički - Sound Technician
Anto Janković - Vocales
Vladimir Delač - Producer

External links

1979 debut albums
Divlje jagode albums
Jugoton albums